Parthan Kanda Paralokam is a 2008 Malayalam fantasy action film directed by Anil, starring Jayaram and Sridevika in the lead roles. The film also features Mukesh, Jagathy Sreekumar, Kottayam Naseer and Salim Kumar in supportive roles. Kalabhavan Mani played negative role.

Plot
Parthasarathy, popularly called Parthan, lives in Krishnapuram village. Parthan is constantly clashing with his uncle Falgunan Thampy, who is the Panchayath President. Falgunan is least bothered about the welfare of the people; rather, he is more keen in grabbing the assets of the village temple, which has been locked for many years by the court over a dispute of ownership. Falgunan, also the secretary of temple's ruling committee, believes that the temple belongs to his family, while Parthan and his friends like Sulaiman and Poonkodi argue that the temple belongs to the village.

Into this situation comes Falgunan's daughter Sathyabhama, an advocate, who pretends to be in love with Parthan. In fact, her intention is to help her father on the temple dispute in the court. As a result, Parthan, who begins an agitation, is sentenced to one month's imprisonment for contempt of court.

After Parthan is released from jail, the film takes an interesting turn. Parthan nearly dies (and is taken to mortuary, declaring him dead) after consuming spurious liquor in Guruvayoor, but miraculously returns to life. After this near-death experience, Lord Krishna is present to help him in the form of Madhavan, pretending to be his college friend and both start fighting Parthan's uncle. Madhavan helps Parthan to clear all the problems of his life. Sathyabhama realises the innocence of Parthan and her father's wickedness and fell in love with Parthan.

Then enters Veerabhadran aka Musafir to steal the Krishan idol from Krishnapuram temple, to disrupt the communal harmony in the village. Parthan fights his plans and with the help of Madhavan, protects the village from disaster. Finally Parthan and Satyabhama are united in marriage.

Cast

Soundtrack

Parthan Kanda Paralokam has music composed by M. Jayachandran. The lyrics are by renowned poet Kaithapram Damodaran Namboothiri. The film has three songs. The singers are Unni Menon, Jassie Gift, Pradeep, Deepak and  Ganga.

Reception
The film could not rise to the expectations and was declared a flop at the box-office.
Rediff.com made mostly negative remarks and gave the film a rating of 1.5 stars out of 5. Bharatstudent.com also gave the film a rating of 1.5 out of 5, commenting the film as a disappointment.

References

External links

 OneIndia article
 Nowrunning article

2000s Malayalam-language films
Indian fantasy action films
Films shot in Thrissur
Films scored by M. Jayachandran
2008 romantic comedy films
Films based on short fiction
2008 films